Roccafiorita (Sicilian: Roccaciurita) is a comune (municipality) in the Province of Messina in the Italian region Sicily, located about  east of Palermo and about  southwest of Messina.

References

External links
 Official website

Cities and towns in Sicily